Sebastián Jahnsen Madico (born 8 September 1990) is a Peruvian swimmer. He was born in Lima. He competed at the 2012 Summer Olympics in the men's 200 metre freestyle, finishing 34th fastest in the heats, failing to qualify for the semifinals. He also competed in the 50 metre and 100 metre events at the 2013 World Aquatics Championships.

References

Peruvian male freestyle swimmers
1990 births
Living people
Olympic swimmers of Peru
Swimmers at the 2012 Summer Olympics
Swimmers at the 2011 Pan American Games
Pan American Games competitors for Peru
21st-century Peruvian people